Tracy Quinton Rocker (born April 9, 1966) is an American football coach and former player who is the defensive line coach for the Philadelphia Eagles of the National Football League (NFL).

Rocker played college football at Auburn University and professionally in the NFL for the Washington Redskins from 1989 to 1990. He was inducted into the College Football Hall of Fame in 2004.

Playing career
Rocker played high school football at Fulton High School in Atlanta, for Coach Willie Hunter, which later merged with Walter F. George High School to become South Atlanta High School.

College
In 1988, Rocker won both the Lombardi Award and Outland Trophy, the first SEC player to do so.  He played defensive tackle for Auburn University.  An Auburn great, Rocker was inducted into the College Football Hall of Fame by the National Football Foundation in December 2004 in New York City, and was inducted into Alabama's state Sports Hall of Fame in the summer of 2005.

A two-time All-American and a three-time All-SEC selection as a player at Auburn, Rocker was named SEC Player of the Year during his senior season.  He finished his career with 354 tackles, including 21 quarterback sacks and 48 tackles for loss.  During his tenure, Auburn won a pair of league titles, and Rocker was voted to the school's Team of the Century in 1993.  In 2004, Rocker was inducted into the College Football Hall of Fame.

Professional
Rocker was selected in the third round of the 1989 NFL Draft by the Washington Redskins and was selected to the NFL All-Rookie team in 1990.  However, after playing only two seasons in the NFL with the Redskins, he concluded his playing career with a one-year stint with the Orlando Thunder in the World League of American Football.

Coaching career
Rocker returned to Auburn to complete his undergraduate degree in 1992 and began his coaching career with the Auburn High School Tigers the same year. After serving two seasons as defensive coordinator at the school, he spent three years as a defensive line coach at West Alabama (1994–96).

Prior to his stint at Cincinnati, Rocker spent five seasons as the defensive line coach at Troy State University in Troy, Alabama.  While at TSU, three of his players received Division I-AA All-America honors, including Al Lucas, who earned the 1999 Buck Buchanan Award as the top defensive player in Division I-AA. A total of 13 TSU players garnered all-conference accolades under Rocker, while five players went on to sign NFL contracts, including Marcus Spriggs, who was drafted by the Cleveland Browns in the sixth round in 1999.

Rocker joined Houston Nutt's staff at Arkansas after one year at Cincinnati where he helped the Bearcats win a share of the 2002 Conference USA (C-USA) title. Rocker spent five years as the defensive line coach of the Razorbacks. His 2006 line ranked fourth in the SEC and thirty-third in the nation in rushing defense, holding opponents to 114.57 yards per game. Arkansas also ranked first in the SEC and twenty-first nationally in tackles for loss with 6.93. When Houston Nutt went to Ole Miss before the 2008 season, Rocker joined his Rebels staff.

In January 2009, Rocker left Ole Miss to coach the defensive line at his alma mater, Auburn University.

He was hired to be the defensive line coach for the Tennessee Titans in February 2011. Rocker's only previous NFL experience as a coach was as a participant in the NFL Minority Coaching Fellowship Program, working with the Indianapolis Colts in 2001 and the Tampa Bay Buccaneers in 2006.

In January 2014, Rocker was let go by the Titans and was hired to be the defensive line coach for the Georgia Bulldogs. On January 12, 2015, Rocker was promoted to Associate Head Coach. On February 7, 2017, Rocker was fired as the Georgia Bulldogs defensive line coach. Rocker was revealed to have committed a minor recruiting violation while at Georgia although the violation was unrelated to his firing. Rocker was hired by the University of Tennessee where he spent two years serving as the defensive line coach. In February 2020, Rocker was hired as defensive line coach at the University of South Carolina.

Following the conclusion of the 2020 football season, the Auburn Tigers bought out his contract and he joined former Gamecock assistant Mike Bobo at Auburn.  After a week at Auburn, in 2021, Rocker returned to the NFL to serve as the defensive line coach for the Philadelphia Eagles.

Players coached
In his first season with the Razorbacks, UA's 2003 defensive line helped the Hogs finish fifth in the SEC in total defense, allowing 344.0 yards per game.  In 2004, Rocker coached first-team All-SEC end Jeb Huckeba, who produced 56 tackles, 13 tackles for loss and 6.5 sacks.  Huckeba was selected in the fifth round of the NFL Draft.  Rocker's 2005 unit tied for second in the SEC with 29 sacks and was fourth in rushing defense behind Jackson, who earned second-team All-SEC honors after finishing fourth on the team with 74 tackles.

Under Rocker's guidance, Jamaal Anderson was the premier pass rusher in the SEC in 2006 with 14 sacks for 100 yards and 20.5 tackles for loss.  The honorable mention All-American ranked third nationally in sacks per game with 1.0, while his 20.5 TFL ranked 12th.  Anderson also notched 65 tackles and a team-best 26 quarterback hurries.  Anderson was selected as the eighth pick of the first round of the 2007 NFL Draft, while fellow Razorback defensive lineman Keith Jackson was taken in the seventh round.

In 2010, Rocker coached 2010 Lombardi Award winner, AP All-American defensive lineman, and AP SEC defensive player of the year Nick Fairley, as well as AP second-team All-SEC defensive lineman Antoine Carter.  Fairley led the SEC with 21 tackles for loss and was second in the SEC with 10.5 sacks.

Rocker was a member of the Auburn staff which won the 2011 BCS National Championship Game.

Personal life
A native of Atlanta, Rocker and his wife, Lalitha, have a son, Kumar, who is a baseball pitcher drafted by the Texas Rangers.

Rocker's younger brother, David, also attended Auburn and played professional football.

References

External links
 

1966 births
Living people
African-American coaches of American football
African-American players of American football
All-American college football players
American football defensive tackles
Arkansas Razorbacks football coaches
Auburn High School (Alabama) people
Auburn Tigers football coaches
Auburn Tigers football players
Cincinnati Bearcats football coaches
College Football Hall of Fame inductees
Georgia Bulldogs football coaches
High school football coaches in Alabama
Ole Miss Rebels football coaches
Players of American football from Atlanta
Tennessee Titans coaches
Troy Trojans football coaches
Washington Redskins players
West Alabama Tigers football coaches
21st-century African-American people
20th-century African-American sportspeople
Philadelphia Eagles coaches